DeLisle Stewart (March 16, 1870 – February 2, 1941) was an American astronomer.

In 1896 he became a staff member of Harvard College Observatory, and from 1898 to 1901 he worked at that observatory's station at Arequipa, Peru, where he took the photographic plates that William Henry Pickering used to discover Saturn's moon Phoebe.  He discovered many new nebulas.

Later he worked at Cincinnati Observatory until 1910, and later founded the Cincinnati Astronomical Society.

He discovered the asteroid 475 Ocllo.

References

External links
 Brief obituary

1870 births
1941 deaths
Harvard University staff
American astronomers
Discoverers of asteroids
Harvard College Observatory people